The NT Indigenous Music Awards 2006 is the 3rd annual National Indigenous Music Awards, established by MusicNT.

The awards ceremony was held on 25 August 2006. More than 2,000 people filed into Darwin's Amphitheatre to witness the event.

Performers

Hall of Fame Inductee 
 Warumpi Band and Soft Sands

Outstanding Contribution to Music Awards 
 Sammy Butcher and Keith Lapalung

Awards
Act of the Year

Best Male Musician

Best Female Musician

Best Emerging Artist of the Year

Best Music Release

Song of the Year Award

Best Cover Art

Best DVD Release

Traditional Music Award

References

2006 in Australian music
2006 music awards
National Indigenous Music Awards